Sam Pinkleton is an American theatre choreographer and director. He is best known for choreographing the Broadway musical Natasha, Pierre, & the Great Comet of 1812, for which he received a Tony Award nomination. Pinkleton's additional work on Broadway includes choreographing the 2017 productions of Amélie  and Significant Other.

Life and Career 
Sam Pinkleton was born on July 20th, 1987 in a small town named Hopewell, right outside of Richmond, Virginia. As a child he attended Carter G. Woodson Middle School. Pinkleton also attended and graduated from The Appomattox Regional Governor's School for the Arts And Technology in Petersburg where he used to play the saxophone. He moved to NYC when he was 18 to attend New York University as a Musical Theatre major, but later switched to the directing program instead. His first Broadway credit was in 2014 as Assistant Director, working on The Lyons by Nicky Silver. Pinkleton’s first choreography credit on Broadway was for a revival of Sophie Treadwell’s Machinal. He started working on his most famous Broadway show, Natasha, Pierre, and the Great Comet of 1812, in 2013, after seeing the first performance of it in 2012 at Ars Nova. The director of the show, Rachel Chavkin, asked Pinkleton to help with staging the show for a bigger space, to which he agreed to do. The Great Comet then had a third run at American Repertory Theatre in Cambridge before finally transferring to Broadway. During its Broadway run, the show garnered 12 Tony Nominations including Best Choreography for Sam Pinkleton. Some of his most recent work includes co-choreographing and co-directing a production of Head Over Heels at the Pasadena Playhouse along with Jenny Koons as well as creating a cruise ship show for Virgin Voyages titled Untitled DanceShowPartyThing with Ani Taj and Sunny Min-Sook Hitt. In 2019 Pinkleton worked as an artist-in-residence at Pace University. Pinkleton is currently working at Princeton University as a lecturer while dating theatre maker Andrew Russell.

Choreographic Style 
Pinkleton often talks about not having a style, but instead focusing on the current dancers he has and working with them to create something together. Pinkleton says that he never choreographs on his own body, and tries to use the previous experience and special abilities of the actors to inspire his movement.

Theatre Work

Awards and nominations

References 

Year of birth missing (living people)
Living people
American theatre directors
New York University alumni